The 1994–95 Scottish Football League Third Division was the 1st season of the league since its demise at the end of the 1954–55 season. The league was created from the bottom 8 clubs of the 1993–94 Second Division plus two new entrants from the Highland Football League, Caledonian Thistle of Inverness and Ross County from Dingwall. The season started on 12 August 1994 and ended on 12 May 1995. Forfar Athletic finished top and were promoted alongside runners-up Montrose. Albion Rovers finished bottom.

Teams for 1994–95

The bottom eight clubs from the 1993–94 Second Division were moved and effectively relegated to create the new Third Division. The teams were Alloa Athletic, Forfar Athletic, East Stirlingshire, Montrose, Queen's Park, Arbroath, Albion Rovers and Cowdenbeath. Two new clubs were admitted to the Scottish Football League from the Highland Football League in the form of Caledonian Thistle and Ross County to complete the 10 teams.

Overview
Relegated from Second Division to create the new Third Division
 Alloa Athletic
 Forfar Athletic
 East Stirlingshire
 Montrose
 Queen's Park
 Arbroath
 Albion Rovers
 Cowdenbeath

Newly admitted to the Third Division from the Highland Football League
 Caledonian Thistle
 Ross County

Stadia and locations

Table

Notes
 A. Albion Rovers 0–4 Alloa Athletic (13 August 1994); Caledonian Thistle 0–4 Queen's Park (20 August 1994); Queen's Park 0–4 Arbroath (19 November 1994); Caledonian Thistle 0–4 Montrose (14 February 1995); Cowdenbeath 0–4 Montrose (6 May 1995).

References

External links 
Official site
1994/1995 Scottish Third Division at Soccerway
Scottish Football Archive

Scottish Third Division seasons
Scot
4